Sky Sports News  (SSN) is a British paid television sports news channel run by Sky, a division of Comcast.

History 

Since 1992, Sky Sports had broadcast sports news, initially a brief Football Update and later this was expanded into a 30-minute programme called Sky Sports Centre. These programmes were generally broadcast on weekdays at 6pm and 10pm.

Sky Sports News launched on 1 October 1998, the launch date of BSkyB's Digital Satellite service, and was BSkyB's first digital only channel. On 10 April 2000, Sky Sports News relaunched as Sky Sports.com TV, to tie with the launch of the SkySports.com website.

The channel scrapped its ".com TV" look, and on 1 July 2001, Sky Sports News launched another graphics change. A major part of this was the standardisation, i.e. a more corporate look across the Sky channels. The channel also scrapped its slogan and just paid attention to the fact of the news.

From 2002, Sky Sports News was available free to view on digital terrestrial TV. From April 2002, Sky Sports News had another face-lift. The channel stayed in the same studio, but with a silver look replacing the old wooden bench, and there was a promise of being first for breaking news, along with much more useful information.

In 2004, Sky Sports News changed its image, with a more open blue look to the channel. The titles featured players such as Frank Lampard, Tim Cahill, Thierry Henry and Ryan Giggs passing the football to each other and unveiling the Sky Sports News logo. Programmes such as Sky Sports Centre which was sponsored previously by Strongbow in 1996 and Ford in 1998 to 2004 - were dropped, and replaced with shows such as Sky Sports Now, Sky Sports Today, Sports Saturday, Sports Sunday, Good Morning Sports Fans, Through the Night, News HQ at 5, News HQ at 6, Gillette Soccer Special, Goals Express, Today's Goals Now and Sky Sports News at Ten.

On 20 May 2007, SSN broadcast the Conference National play-off Final between Exeter City and Morecambe. This was the first live match to be shown on the channel since certain European games involving British teams were shown to provide exclusivity when competing with the then operational OnSports (owned by ITV) as Sky Sports News was not available at that time via digital terrestrial platforms. This was due to all other Sky Sports channels being occupied by live sport. This enabled Freeview viewers to watch a live match on Sky Sports. The station also had live coverage of Wales v New Zealand on 26 May 2007 and the La Liga tie between Espanyol and Barcelona in December 2007.

Virgin Media dispute
On 1 March 2007, Virgin Media removed Sky's basic channels including Sky One, Sky Two, Sky News, Sky Sports News, Sky Travel and Sky Travel Extra, from their Television Services after a dispute between Virgin Media and BSkyB caused by the expiry of their carriage agreement and their inability to reach a new deal, after attempts were made to reach an agreement. At Midnight, Sky Sports News was removed, with its EPG slot being renamed derisively as "OLD SKY SPORTS SNOOZE" (it was removed with a public apology by Richard Branson hours later). As a direct rival to Sky Sports News, Virgin Media and Setanta Sports launched Setanta Sports News on 30 November 2007. A deal was eventually reached between Virgin and Sky resulting in Sky Sports News returning to the Cable platform on 13 November 2008 on channel number 517.

From 1 September 2009, the channel was made available to subscribers of the Sports Pack, in addition to being available in the News & Events Pack.

2010–present
Sky Sports News was removed from Freeview on 23 August 2010 and replaced with Sky3+1, a one-hour timeshift Sky3. Approval for the DTT change was needed from the regulator Ofcom, which told Sky and multiplex licence holder Arqiva that the move "would not unacceptably diminish the capacity of the services broadcast to appeal to a variety of tastes and interests." Sky claimed that the move back to pay TV allowed them to improve the channel through increased editorial investment.

The channel also previously used a different piece of music for each news programme, the most well-known of these being Republica's "Ready to Go", "The Time Is Now" by Moloko, "Surface to Air" by The Chemical Brothers, "Shooting Star" by Deepest Blue, and "Club Foot" by Kasabian.

Sky Sports News was rebranded as Sky Sports News HQ on 12 August 2014. As part of the change the channel moved to Sky channel 401. At the same time the channel introduced an updated studio including brand new features, overhauled graphics and a new theme. Following the rebrand of the Sky Sports channels in July 2017, the channel was once again renamed to its original title Sky Sports News.

Sky Sports News HD 
Sky Sports News HD launched on 23 August 2010 on Sky channel 455, transferring to channel 405 several months later. The HD channel offered enhancements such as widescreen viewing and sharper graphics. A range of new programmes, such as First Fast Now and Sky Sports News at Seven were launched plus new presenters, as well as the extension of existing offerings, such as Ed Chamberlin presenting a regular live Sunday afternoon sports update.

Sky backed the launch of the channel with an extensive advertising campaign.

Programmes 

 Good Morning Sports Fans
 Soccer Saturday
 Soccer Special
 Soccer Sunday 
Super Sunday Matchday
 Goals on Sunday
 Total Football
 The Football Show
 The Transfer Show
 Transfer Talk
 Good Morning Transfers

Simulcasts 

A number of programmes are simulcast on other Sky Sports channels, including Soccer Saturday and many of the midweek Soccer Specials. Also, Sky Sports News airs on Sky Sports Main Event when that channel is not showing live sport.

Soccer Saturday has been simulcast on other Sky Sports channels for many years. Until the 2007/08 season most or all of the programme was broadcast on Sky Sports 1. This was cut back in August 2007 to just the live scores section of the programme i.e. between 15:00 and 17:15. Simulcasting of Soccer Saturday on Sky Sports 1 stopped altogether in August 2010 but returned to Sky Sports 1 for the 2013–14 season as part of Sky Sports 1 devoting all of Saturdays to football. The simulcast ran between 15:00 and 16:55. For the 2014–15 season the simulcasts switched to the newly launched Sky Sports 5. Since the rebranding of the Sky Sports channels in 2017, Soccer Saturday has been shown on Sky Sports Premier League and Sky Sports Football, and more recently, the 3pm to 5pm portion of the programme has also been broadcast on Sky One.

Until 1 July 2013, two hours of live feed (daily at 07:00 BST, weekdays at 17:00 BST) and one hour of delayed feed (daily at 23:00 BST) were picked up by Fox Soccer in the United States; both Fox Soccer Channel and Sky Sports were News Corporation channels at the time. More hours of the channel were picked up in critical periods such as the end of transfer windows and coverage of qualifying draws for Euro tournaments. The American simulcasts were discontinued on that date as Fox Cable Networks wound down Fox Soccer's operations for the 2 September 2013 launch of FX sister channel FXX on its channel space for the launch of Fox Sports 1 and Fox Sports 2. Until March 2017, the only Sky output carried on American TV were darts coverage on BBC America and Sky Sports 2's coverage and related programming, such as The Verdict, involving the England cricket team on ONE World Sports. ONE World Sports closed in March 2017. Sky's English team coverage has since moved to Willow in the United States, including the pre-show and The Verdict.

Upon Comcast's acquisition of Sky, Sky Sports began to collaborate with the networks of its U.S. counterpart NBC Sports (which holds the U.S. media rights to the Premier League), beginning with Sky Sports News transfer window coverage being simulcast on its pay television channel NBCSN, and Sky reporters contributing to an NBCSN-produced transfer window programme hosted by its own Premier League pundits. In February 2019, it was announced that beginning 4 March 2019, an hour of programming from Sky Sports News would air daily on NBCSN at 11:00 a.m. ET (as part of a new daytime lineup resulting from its loss of rights to The Dan Patrick Show). The simulcast is dropped temporarily at times to facilitate other programming, such as the run-up to the American National Football League's draft in April. NBCSN began re-airing Sky Sports News from August 2020 until the network's demise on December 31, 2021.

Notable presenters

Current notable presenters 
David Garrido 
Pete Graves
Hayley McQueen
Nick Powell
Jasper Taylor
Simon Thomas
Clare Tomlinson
Mike Wedderburn
Tom White 
Jo Wilson
Rob Wotton

Former presenters 
Kate Abdo 
David Bobin
Kelly Cates
Ed Chamberlin
Millie Clode
Kirsty Gallacher
Alex Hammond
Adam Leventhal
Dan Lobb
Matthew Lorenzo
Sam Matterface
Natalie Sawyer
Georgie Thompson
Rachel Wyse
Charlie Webster
Jim White

See also 
Sky News
Sky Sports

References

External links

Sky Sports
1998 establishments in the United Kingdom
Fox Soccer original programming
Sports television channels in the United Kingdom
Sports television in the United Kingdom
Television channels and stations established in 1998